Sandra Masone is a boom operator.

She was nominated for a Daytime Emmy for Outstanding Achievement in Live and Direct to Tape Sound Mixing for a Drama Series for her work as a boom operator on General Hospital.

References

Living people
Year of birth missing (living people)
Place of birth missing (living people)